Barbed Wire Maggots is the fourth studio album by Borbetomagus, released in 1983 by Agaric Records.

Track listing

Personnel 
Adapted from Barbed Wire Maggots liner notes.

Borbetomagus
 Don Dietrich – saxophone
 Donald Miller – electric guitar, cover art
 Jim Sauter – saxophone

Production and additional personnel
 Larry Alexander – assistant engineer
 Don Sigal – assistant producer

Release history

References

External links 
 

1983 albums
Borbetomagus albums